Jorge Constantino Gaona Aranda, more commonly known as Jorge Gaona (born 26 January 1985 in Asunción), is a Paraguayan football midfielder.

He was part of the Paraguay under-20 squad that competed at the 2005 South American Youth Championship.

Honours
Iran's Premier Football League Winner: 1
2007–08 with Persepolis

References

External links 
 Jorge Aranda's Agency

1985 births
Paraguayan footballers
Association football midfielders
Living people
Cerro Porteño players
Persepolis F.C. players
Expatriate footballers in Iran